Kom is a song written by Rob Wåtz and Raz Lindwall and performed by Jessica Andersson. The song was selected as one of the competing songs in Melodifestivalen 2007, a song competition to represent Sweden at the Eurovision Song Contest. The song finished fourth in the second semi-final on 10 February 2007 and processed to the second chance round, where it was eliminated by Sanna Nielsen's "Vågar du, vågar jag" on 3 March 2007.

The single was released on 9 March 2007, peaking at number 16 on the Swedish Singles Chart.

Track listing
CD single
 "Kom"  (Original)  - 3:00
 "Kom"  (Extended Version)  - 3:29
 "Kom"  (Single Version)  - 2:59

Charts

Release history

References 

2007 singles
2006 songs
Jessica Andersson songs
Melodifestivalen songs of 2007